Pena is the biggest Šar river in Polog, North Macedonia after the Vardar River. It is the biggest Vardarian tributary from the Šar lakes.

Spring and course

The spring of Pena starts in the region of Čabriolica and Borisloica, high on the Šar Mountains, 2,500 metres above sea level. At first, there are two small streams that merge at the villages of Vešala and Bozovce.

Going through the center of Tetovo it hangs up in the Polog valley and near the village of Saraḱino it flows into the Vardar.

Characteristics

The springs of the river are on 2,500 metres above sea level and is 27 km long. In its river-bed pour 12 other rivers. The most important of these include the Karanikolovska River, the Przhina, the Vejčka, the Lesnhička, and the Brodečka.

Significance

The Pena River is important for the city of Tetovo not just as a symbol of the city, but as economic object as well. From touristic view the river with the wild mountainous flow and beautiful waterfalls it attracts a lot of tourists. From economic view the river is important because on her are built four hydrocenters, one of which was the first in Macedonia.

In 1979, after torrential rains, the river overflowed and caused flooding in Tetovo.

References

See also

Tetovo
Šar Mountains

Rivers of North Macedonia
Šar Mountains